Dame Vera Lynn is one of the ferries currently operating the Woolwich Ferry service in London. The ship was named after the singer whose songs became popular during the Second World War. Dame Vera Lynn was born in East Ham and grew up not far from the ferry.

The vessel and sister ship  arrived in London in 2018 to replace the existing ferries that had been in service since the 1960s. Both were built by Remontowa in Gdańsk, Poland, have an automatic docking system to hold the ferry in place during loading, and are equipped with hybrid engines that allow them to run on electricity generated by motors.

Both vessels have suffered from numerous technical issues resulting in closures and service reductions, with Mayor of London Sadiq Khan apologising in November 2019 and stating the new ferries "aren't good enough".

References 

Woolwich Ferry
Water transport in London
Ships built in Gdańsk
2018 ships